The Aufruf der Kulturschaffenden (translated from German into English as "call to the artists", or more literally "call to the cultural workers" or "call to the cultural sector")  was a declaration by German artists of their loyalty to Adolf Hitler.  The Aufruf was printed in the Völkischer Beobachter, the Nazi party newspaper, on 18 August 1934, the day before a plebiscite to confirm the merger of the offices of President (the head of state), and Chancellor (the head of government), in the person of Adolf Hitler.

Hitler was appointed as Chancellor of Germany following a general election in January 1933.  After the Reichstag fire on 27 February 1933, and elections that returned Hitler to power on 5 March, Hitler moved rapidly to consolidate his power with the passing of the Enabling Act on 23 March 1933, which allowed Hitler bypass the German legislature and pass laws at will.  After the death of President Paul von Hindenburg on 2 August, a referendum was passed on 19 August, with 88.1% voting to confirm the merger of the post of President with that of Chancellor, and Hitler became Führer und Reichskanzler.

The declaration states confidence in the leadership of Adolf Hitler, faith in and loyalty to him, and hope for the future.  The statement followed similar public statements by others such as writers and poets (the Gelöbnis treuester Gefolgschaft in October 1933) and university professors (the Bekenntnis der deutschen Professoren zu Adolf Hitler, in November 1933).

Among the artists to sign the Aufruf were:
 Ernst Barlach (1870-1938), sculptor, writer and artist
 Emil Fahrenkamp (1885-1966), architect 
 Wilhelm Furtwängler (1886-1954), conductor and composer
 Gustav Havemann (1882-1960), violinist
 Erich Heckel (1883-1970), painter and graphic artist
 Hanns Johst (1890-1978), writer
 Georg Kolbe (1877-1947), sculptor
 Erwin Guido Kolbenheyer (1878-1962), writer
 Agnes Miegel (1879-1964), writer, journalist and poet
 Ludwig Mies van der Rohe (1886-1969), architect 
 Emil Nolde (1867-1956), painter
 Hans Pfitzner (1869-1949), composer 
 Richard Strauss (1864-1949), composer 
 Josef Thorak (1889-1952), sculptor

Some works of several of the artists to sign the Aufruf were later condemned as degenerate art.

References
  (in German)

Nazi propaganda
1934 documents
Oaths of allegiance
Nazi culture
1934 in Germany